Kraskovo is a village and municipality in the Rimavská Sobota District of the Banská Bystrica Region of southern Slovakia.  Notable attractions include a late gothic evangelical  church containing renaissance paintings and featuring a wooden belfry constructed in 1657. In the village is a memorial to 19th century Slovak writer August Horislav Škultéty.

External links
 
 
https://web.archive.org/web/20160403210122/http://kraskovo.e-obce.sk/
Evangelical church information

Villages and municipalities in Rimavská Sobota District